The 2014 SEABA Championship for Women was the 8th SEABA Championship for Women. It was held in Semarang, Indonesia from May 26 to May 29, coinciding with the 2014 SEABA Under-18 Championship for Women.

Malaysia defeated Indonesia in the finals, 65–53, to clinch its second title which they last won 15 years ago in Genting in Malaysia.

Round robin

Final

Final standings

Awards

References

2014
International women's basketball competitions hosted by Indonesia
2014 in women's basketball
May 2014 sports events in Asia
2013–14 in Asian basketball
2013–14 in Malaysian basketball
2013–14 in Indonesian basketball
2013–14 in Singaporean basketball
2014 in Indonesian women's sport